

Station List

Ta

Te

To

Tr

Tsu

T